Aziz Khan may refer to:

Aziz Khan (general), former Chairman of Joint Chiefs of Staff of Pakistan Army
Aziz Ahmed Khan, Pakistan Ambassador to India
Aziz Khan (squash player), Pakistani squash player
Aziz Khan (businessman), chairman, Summit Group